"Bullet in the Brain" is a song by American rock band The Black Keys. It was released as the third single from their eighth studio album Turn Blue on June 30, 2014 in the United Kingdom. The band performed the song on the American sketch comedy television show Saturday Night Live three days prior to the release of Turn Blue in promotion of the album.

Charts

Release history

References

The Black Keys songs
Songs written by Dan Auerbach
Songs written by Patrick Carney
2014 singles
2014 songs
Songs written by Danger Mouse (musician)
Song recordings produced by Danger Mouse (musician)